Dorothy Bacon is a former United States international lawn bowler.

Bowls career
Bacon won a bronze medal at the 1977 World Outdoor Bowls Championship in Worthing in the triples event with Corinna Folkins and Louise Godfrey.

References

American female bowls players
Possibly living people

Year of birth missing